Shu Jie Lam is a Malaysian-Chinese research chemist specialising in biomolecular engineering.  She is researching star polymers designed to attack superbugs as antibiotics.

References

Malaysian chemists
Nanotechnology
People from Batu Pahat
University of Melbourne alumni
Malaysian women chemists